Erythrae is an ancient Ionian city in Asia Minor.

Erythrae, Erythrai (ancient Greek: Ἐρυθραί), or Erythra may also refer to:
Erythrae (Ainis), a city of Ainis, ancient Thessaly, Greece
Erythrae (Boeotia), a city of ancient Boeotia, Greece
Erythrae (Locris), a city of ancient Locris, Greece

Classic Literature Sources 
Chronological listing of classical literature sources for Erythrae:

 Homer, Iliad 2. 499 ff (trans. Murray) (Greek epic poetry C8th BC)
 Euripides, The Bacchantes 747 ff (trans. Coleridge) (Greek tragedy C5th BC)
 Herodotus 1. 142 (trans. Godley) (Greek history C5th BC)
 Herodotus 9. 15
 Herodotus 9. 22
 Herodotus 9. 25
 Thucydides 3. 24 (trans. Smith) (Greek history C5th BC)
 Thucydides 8. 24
 Thucydides 8. 28
 Thucydides 8. 32
 Thucydides 8. 33
 Xenophon, Hellenica 5. 4. 40 ff (trans. Brownson) (Greek History C4th BC)
 Aristotle, Politica 5. 6. 19 ff or 1035b ff (trans. Jowett) (Greek philosopher C4th BC)
 Pseudo-Aristotle, De Mirabilibus Auscultationibus 838a ff or 95. 8 ff (ed. Ross trans. Dowdall) (Greek rhetoric C4th to 3rd BC)
 Theophrastus, Enquiry into Plants, Concerning Odours, 48 ff (trans. Hort) (Greek philosophy C4th to C3rd BC)
 Theophrastus, Enquiry into Plants, Concerning Odours, 52 ff
 Herodas, The Mimes and Fragments 6. 57 ff (trans. Headlam ed. Knox) (Greek poetry C3rd BC)
 Diodorus Siculus, Library of History 5. 79. 1 ff (trans. Oldfather) (Greek history C1st BC)
 Diodorus Siculus, Library of History 11. 29. 4 ff
 Diodorus Siculus, Library of History 20. 107. 5 ff
 Livy, The History of Rome 27. 8 (trans. M'Devitte) (Roman history C1st BC to C1st AD)
 Livy, The History of Rome 28. 8. 8 ff (trans. Moore)
 Livy, The History of Rome 45. 28. 8 ff (trans. Schlesinger)
 Strabo, Geography 14. 1. 3 (trans. Jones) (Greek geography C1st BC to C1st AD)
 Strabo, Geography 14. 1. 31
 Strabo, Geography 14. 1. 32
 Strabo, Geography 14. 1. 33
 Strabo, Geography 14. 1. 34
 Statius, Thebaid 7. 265 ff (trans. Mozley) (Roman epic poetry C1st AD)
 Statius, Thebaid 9. 769 ff
 Pliny, Natural History 4. 7. 27 (trans. Rackham) (Roman history C1st AD
 Pliny, Natural History 5. 31. 116 ff (trans. Rackham)
 Pliny, Natural History 5. 38 (Chios) (trans. Bostock & Riley)
 Pliny, Natural History 11. 36 (trans. Rackham)
 Pliny, Natural History 31. 10 (trans. Jones)
 Pliny, Natural History 32. 11 (trans. Jones)
 Pliny, Natural History 35. 46 (Works in Pottery) (trans. Bostock & Riley)
 Tacitus, The Annals 6. 12 (trans. Church) (Roman history C1st to C2nd AD)
 Plutarch, Moralia, The Oracles at Delphi 401 ff (trans. Babbitt) (Greek history C1st to C2nd AD)
 Plutarch, Moralia, The Oracles At Delphi 403 B ff
 Plutarch, Moralia, Table-Talk 5. 675 B ff (trans. Clement & Hoffleit)
 Pausanias, Description of Greece 6. 15. 3. 6 ff (trans. Frazer) (Greek travelogue C2nd AD)
 Pausanias, Description of Greece 6. 21. 7. 11 ff
 Pausanias, Description of Greece 7. 3. 4
 Pausanias, Description of Greece 7. 3. 5. 10 ff
 Pausanias, Description of Greece 7. 5. 3-4 ff
 Pausanias, Description of Greece 9. 2. 1
 Pausanias, Description of Greece 9. 27. 1
 Pausanias, Description of Greece 9. 27. 5
 Aelian, On Animals 2. 20 (trans. Scholfield) (Greek natural history C2nd AD)
 Appian, The Mithridatic Wars 46 (trans. White) (Greek history C2nd AD)
 Athenaeus, Banquet of the Learned 6. 75 (trans. Yonge) (Greek rhetoric C2nd to C3rd AD)
 Fragment, Theopompus (or Cratippus), Hellenica, Constitution of Boeotia (P. Oxy. 842, The Oxyrhynchus Papyri trans. Grenfell & Hunt 1908 Vol 5 p. 223) (Greek history C2nd to C3rd AD)
 Scholiast on Theopompus (or Cratippus), Hellenica, Constitution of Boeotia 12-13 (The Oxyrhynchus Papyri trans. Grenfell & Hunt 1908 Vol 5 p. 226)
 Pseudo-Herodotus, Life of Homer (trans. Mackenzie) (The Greek Classics Vol 2 ed. Miller 1909 Epic Literature p. 397) (Greek Epic poetry C3rd to C4th AD)

Chronological listing of classical literature sources for Erythra:

 Propertius, Elegies, 2. 13. 1 ff (trans. Butler) (Latin poetry C1st BC)
 Strabo, Geography 16. 3. 1 (trans. Jones) (Greek geography C1st BC to C1st AD)
 Strabo, Geography 16. 4. 20
 Athenaeus, Banquet of the Learned 3. 77 Loaves (trans. Yonge) (Greek rhetoric C2nd to C3rd AD)
 Pausanias, Description of Greece 6. 21. 7. 11 ff (trans. Frazer) (Greek travelogue C2nd AD)
 Philostratus, Life of Apollonius of Tyana 50 (trans. Conyreare) (Greek travelogue C3rd AD)
 Philostratus, Life of Apollonius of Tyana 53

See also
Erythraea (disambiguation)
Erythras